Dwight Nelson (22 July 1946 – 24 December 2018) was a former Jamaican politician. He is the former Minister of National Security of Jamaica until 2011 when his party lost the election.

Loss
He was a former senator and was put as a candidate for MP but lost to Julian Robinson. Dwight Nelson was then excluded from the senate.

References

Members of the House of Representatives of Jamaica
Government ministers of Jamaica
1946 births
2018 deaths